Faujasiidae is a family of echinoderms belonging to the order Clypeasteroida.

Genera

Genera:
 Actapericulum Holmes, 1995
 †Australanthus Bittner, 1892
 Cardiopygus Aziz & Badve, 2001

References

Clypeasteroida
Echinoderm families